Paulo Souza may refer to:

Paulo Renato Souza (1945–2011), Brazilian economist and politician
Paulo Souza (athlete), see Brazil at the 2012 Summer Paralympics and Brazil at the 2011 Parapan American Games

See also
 Paulo Sousa (disambiguation)
Marcos (footballer, born 1974) (Marcos Paulo Souza Ribeiro)
Leandro Souza (footballer, born 1987) (Leandro Paulo Roberto Souza)
João Paulo (footballer, born 1988) (João Paulo de Souza Dantas)
Paulo Vinícius (footballer, born 1990) (Paulo Vinícius Souza dos Santos)